The 2016 Amex-Istanbul Challenger was a professional tennis tournament played on hard courts. It was the 29th edition of the tournament which was part of the 2016 ATP Challenger Tour. It took place in Istanbul, Turkey between 12 and 18 September 2016.

Singles main-draw entrants

Seeds

 1 Rankings are as of August 29, 2016.

Other entrants
The following players received wildcards into the singles main draw: 
  Muhammet Haylaz
  Altuğ Çelikbilek
  Anıl Yüksel
  Barkın Yalçinkale

The following players received entry into the singles main draw with a protected ranking:
  Denis Matsukevich

The following players received entry from the qualifying draw:
  Vitaly Kozyukov
  Cem İlkel
  José Francisco Vidal Azorín
  Daniel Elahi Galán

Champions

Singles

 Malek Jaziri def.   Dudi Sela, 1–6, 6–1, 6–0.

Doubles

 Sadio Doumbia /  Calvin Hemery def.  Marco Chiudinelli /  Marius Copil, 6–4, 6–3.

External links
Official Website

American Express - TED Open
PTT İstanbul Cup
2016 in Turkish tennis